Luuk may refer to:

Places:
Luuk, Sulu, 4th class municipality in the province of Sulu, Philippines
Liège, City in Belgium, known in Limburgish as Luuk

People:
Kristian Luuk (born 1966), Swedish comedian and talk show-host of Estonian descent
Luuk Balkestein (born 1954), retired Dutch football player
Luuk de Jong (born 1990), Dutch footballer
Luuk Folkerts (born 1963), Dutch politician and environmental consultant
Luuk Gruwez (born 1953), Flemish poet
Luuk Tinbergen (1915–1955), Dutch ornithologist and ecologist
Luuk van Middelaar (born 1973), Dutch historian and liberal philosopher
Luuk van Troost (born 1969), Dutch former cricketer, captained the national team

See also
Sen kväll med Luuk (Late night with Luuk) was one of Sweden's and TV4's most popular talk shows ever and started airing in 1996

Dutch masculine given names